The Ritz is a 1976 British-American comedy farce film directed by Richard Lester based on the 1975 play of the same name by Terrence McNally. Actress Rita Moreno – who had won a Tony Award for her performance as Googie Gomez in the Broadway production – and many others from the 1975 original cast, such as Jack Weston, Jerry Stiller, and F. Murray Abraham, reprised their stage roles in the film version. Also in the cast were Kaye Ballard and Treat Williams. The film, Jack Weston, and Rita Moreno all received Golden Globe nominations in the comedy category. It opened to mixed reviews.

It was shot at Twickenham Studios in London with sets designed by the art director Philip Harrison.

Plot 
In a gay bathhouse in Manhattan, unsuspecting heterosexual businessman Gaetano Proclo has taken refuge from his homicidal brother-in-law, mobster Carmine Vespucci – whose name he uses on the register. In the bathhouse, Gaetano stumbles across an assortment of oddball characters, including a rabid chubby chaser, go-go boys, a squeaky-voiced detective, and Googie Gomez, a third-rate entertainer with visions of Broadway glory who mistakes him for a famous producer and whom he mistakes for a man in drag. Further complications arise when Gaetano's wife Vivian tracks him down and jumps to the wrong conclusions about his sexual orientation.

Cast

Reception 
Rotten Tomatoes reports that 64% of 11 surveyed critics gave the film a positive review; the average rating was 5.7/10.

Roger Ebert of the Chicago Sun-Times gave the film two-and-a-half stars out of four and wrote that it "never quite succeeds. Its ambition is clearly to be a screwball comedy in the tradition of the 1930s classics and such recent attempts as What's Up, Doc? and Silent Movie. But it lacks the manic pacing, and the material grows thin." Richard Eder of The New York Times wrote that the film "does work to some degree" but the "acting is often more energetic than funny." Arthur D. Murphy of Variety wrote "Depending on where one's taste lies, The Ritz is either esoteric farce for the urban cosmopolite, or else one long tasteless and anachronistic Fiftyish 'gay' joke. Richard Lester's latest effort is, more accurately, an uneven combination of both extremes." Gene Siskel gave the film three stars out of four and wrote that "a good chunk of the film's humor seems forced... But 'The Ritz' grows on you as the film progresses." Penelope Gilliatt of The New Yorker thought that unlike the play, "some binding poignancy is missing from the film" because Richard Lester, as a heterosexual, was "making a picture about homosexuality from the outside." Nevertheless, she found many of the slapstick scenes "splendiferously funny." Charles Champlin of the Los Angeles Times wrote that the film made the transition from the stage "surprisingly well, given the odds," with "two of the most flamboyantly entertaining and skillful comedy performances of the year" by Jack Weston and Rita Moreno. Gary Arnold of The Washington Post wrote "I missed the play, but there is certainly something amiss with the film, and it appears to be Richard Lester's direction, which fails to establish a rhythm perky enough to transform a farcical plot and set of conventions pleasurably from one medium to another."

DVD 
The Ritz was released to DVD by Warner Home Video on January 8, 2008.

The Ritz was rated M in New Zealand for violence, sexual violence, sexual references and offensive language.

See also 
 Continental Baths

References

External links 

 
 
 
 
 

1976 films
1976 LGBT-related films
1976 comedy films
British comedy films
American comedy films
American LGBT-related films
American films based on plays
Films with screenplays by Terrence McNally
Films directed by Richard Lester
Films shot at Twickenham Film Studios
Warner Bros. films
Films scored by Ken Thorne
1970s English-language films
1970s American films
1970s British films
LGBT-related comedy films